Kapra lake or Oora Cheruvu is a lake located in the Kapra Village near Sainikpuri in the north-east part of Greater Hyderabad, India. Length of its bund is measured at 1254 Meters.

Overview
There are two feeder channels, two sluices, and two surplus courses for the Kapra Lake, this lake being part of a chain of water bodies, wherein the surplus course of the upper water body flows down into the lower water body. Thus, the Kapra Lake is intimately linked in the chain of the R.K. Puram lake, the Annarayan Cheruvu of Nagaram and the Yadi Bai Gunta of Yellareddy Guda.

History
In the early 2000s this lake was deemed pristine and pollution free but in 2012 it was reported as polluted and susceptible to encroachments by the GHMC. A part of the Kapra Lake stands encroached for the past few years and the Greater Hyderabad Municipal Corporation recently listed 25 structures as encroachments of the Karpra Lake liable for demolition, including Sri Venkateshwara Temple. Out of the original 50 FTL pillars fixed by the Greater Hyderabad Municipal Corporation and the Hyderabad Lake Management Circle of the Irrigation Department, 13 pillars stand disturbed and removed by the encroachers. Efforts are underway to re-fix the missing pillars in order to prevent further encroachments. As a part of the citizens' initiative to protect the Kapra Lake, a rudimentary Lake Protection Body has been formed but it has largely remained ineffective. In 2017, there were reports of Kapra lake choked by illegal construction.

See also
 Ramakrishnapuram Lake
 Safilguda Lake

References

Lakes of Hyderabad, India